Joy Masoff (born 1951) is a textbook author. The Virginia public schools have approved 14 of her books, all of which are published by Five Ponds Press. She is also the author of children's books, including Fire!, Emergency, Oh Yuck! The Encyclopedia of Everything Nasty, and Oh Yikes! History's Grossest Moments.  Some of her works grew out of her work as a Cub Scout den leader and with Brownies.

In October 2010, a historian Carol Sheriff, who is a professor at the College of William and Mary, called into question Masoff's scholarship in writing a fourth grade textbook entitled, Our Virginia: Past and Present.  Masoff wrote that thousands of slaves fought in the American Civil War on the side of the South, which is rejected by most historians.  Masoff explained that Virginia state curriculum requires that the role of African-Americans in the war be covered, so she used the internet to research the topic and found three sources.  However, all three sources traced back to the Sons of Confederate Veterans, who do not believe that slavery caused the Civil War.  Masoff said, "It's just one sentence.  I don't want to ruffle any feathers, If the historians had contacted me and asked me to take it out, I would have."

On October 21, the publisher of Our Virginia: Our Past and Present announced that it will distribute sticker labels that can be used to cover the disputed paragraph. Subsequently, another error was spotted regarding a claim that brown bears live in the Blue Ridge Mountains, when in fact only black bears inhabit that area. The publisher has announced that both statements will be removed from the second edition of the book.

School system reactions to the controversy have varied.  the Loudoun County, Virginia, public schools have pulled Our Virginia: Past and Present from its classrooms, while neighboring Prince William County, although not currently using the book, has it and five other Five Pond Press books under consideration.

Masoff is the mother of two and lives with her family in Waccabuc, New York.

Bibliography

References

American children's writers
Living people
People from Waccabuc, New York
1951 births